This is a list of public art in the London Borough of Waltham Forest.

Chingford

Leyton

Leytonstone

Walthamstow

Whipps Cross

References

External links
 

Waltham Forest
Waltham Forest
Tourist attractions in the London Borough of Waltham Forest